Der letzte Bulle (The Last Cop) is a German television series that was first aired in 2010. The series is about a policeman from the 1980s put into a modern police department in Essen.

Plot 
The show is set in Essen, in the center of the Rhine-Ruhr metropolitan region. Mick Brisgau, a homicide detective who was shot in the head on duty in the late 1980s and was then in a coma for 20 years. The show starts when he awakes suddenly from the coma and is allowed to return to his old job at the homicide department. As an old-school macho cop, he doesn't know about modern technology such as cellphones or computers, or modern investigation methods. He tries to deal with the modern world in general, and homicide cases in particular, as if it was still the 1980s.

The rough style of the main character (played by Henning Baum) is complemented by the prudence of his new partner, Andreas Kringge (played by Maximilian Grill). Other characters include 
Brisgau's former partner, Martin Ferchert, who is now head of the homicide department; 
Brisgau's wife, who divorces him during the first season; 
the medical examiner Roland Meisner, who has been living with Brisgau's wife for years; 
Isabelle, Brisgau's adult daughter, whom he has known only as a baby, but who is now an adult; 
the police psychologist Tanja Haffner.

The series uses songs from the 1980s, sometimes to comment on the plot, and features other items from the decade such as Brisgau's Opel Diplomat V8.

Production and transmission
The series ran first on 12 April 2010 on Sat.1 Television with 2.99 million viewers (or 9.2 percent) somewhat below the average of the TV channel. However viewer share increased especially among younger viewers. With the start of the second season, the viewer share almost doubled and Sat.1 ordered a third season. The fourth season aired in Germany beginning 21 January 2013.

The show has been aired in combination with the Sat.1 production Danni Lowinski from the start, but while the latter scored better in the beginning it is now The Last Cop that shows better results. With a viewer share of 15% for The Last Cop and with the two series being the best-running productions of Sat.1, it was announced on 9 April 2013 that a fifth season was being planned for both shows.

The series has been sold to neighbouring countries; it has run on Austrian ÖRF since 31 May 2011. The French Direct 8 has run a dubbed version since March 2012 under the title of Mick Brisgau, le come-back d’un super flic. It is also dubbed for Italian Rai 1 where it runs under the title of Last Cop - L'ultimo sbirro during the summer. In Bulgaria, the series runs as Ченге от миналото on Diema in a dubbed version. In Brazil the show is being aired on cable channel Globosat+ under the name O Último Policial, in German language with Portuguese subtitles. In Spain the series is dubbed and runs as El último poli duro on Canal+ Spain and Cuatro.

Remakes

French
Falco is the series that started in 2013.

U.S.
At Turner Upfront TNT has announced to produce a pilot for a US remake of the German series. The adaptation will see the 1990s cop Mick Branigan to awake after 20 years of coma returning to his job at the LAPD. The pilot is produced by Sylvester Stallone with Fuse Entertainment and Fox Television Studios co-producing the show for TNT.

Estonian
Kanal 2 started the series under name Viimane võmm (The Last Cop) in 2014. The main characters are Mikk Kotkas (actor Üllar Saaremäe), Andreas Prikk (actor Robert Annus) and Tanja Murrik (actress Ülle Lichtfeldt). Kotkas drives old white Volvo 700-series wagon.

Japanese
Nippon Television Network and Hulu announced to produce the mini-series for a Japanese remake of the German series, scheduled to start summer 2015.

Russian
Petersburg – Channel 5 produced first two seasons (39 episodes) of Последний мент (The Last Cop) in 2015-2016. Gosha Kutsenko plays the lead role - captain Alexey Divov.

Czech
The Czech remake Polda (The Cop) premiered on 23 October 2016. Five seasons ran on TV Prima.

References

External links

German comedy-drama television series
German crime television series
2010 German television series debuts
2014 German television series endings
Sat.1 original programming
2010s German police procedural television series
Television shows set in North Rhine-Westphalia
German-language television shows